The 1948–49 NCAA men's basketball season began in December 1948, progressed through the regular season and conference tournaments, and concluded with the 1949 NCAA basketball tournament championship game on March 26, 1949, at Hec Edmundson Pavilion in Seattle, Washington. The Kentucky Wildcats won their second NCAA national championship with a 46–36 victory over the Oklahoma A&M Aggies.

Rule changes
Coaches were permitted to speak to players during time-outs. Previously, under a rule in place since the 1910–11 season, no coaching of players had been permitted during the progress of a game.

Season headlines 

 The Associated Press (AP) Poll debuted. The first national poll for ranking college basketball teams, it was modeled after the AP college football poll, which had begun in the mid-1930s. It ranked the Top 20 teams, and continued to do so until the 1961–62 season, when it became a Top 10 poll.
 The Ohio Valley Conference began play, with six original members.
 The Border Conference began a hiatus from major college basketball competition, playing at the non-major level for two seasons. It would return to major competition in the 1950–51 season.
 The Middle Atlantic States Conference North disbanded at the end of the season.
 The National Invitation Tournament expanded from eight to 12 teams.

Conference membership changes

Regular season

Conference winners and tournaments

Informal championships

Statistical leaders

Post-season tournaments

NCAA tournament

Semifinals & finals 

 Third Place – Illinois 57, Oregon State 53

National Invitation tournament

Semifinals & finals 

 Third Place – Bowling Green State 82, Bradley 77

Awards

Consensus All-American teams

Major player of the year awards 

 Helms Player of the Year: Tony Lavelli, Yale

Other major awards 

 NIT/Haggerty Award (Top player in New York City metro area): Dick McGuire, St. John's

Coaching changes 

A number of teams changed coaches during the season and after it ended.

References